Gerardo Torrado Díez de Bonilla (born 30 April 1979) is a Mexican former professional footballer who played as a defensive midfielder.

Torrado represented Mexico at the 2002, 2006 and 2010 FIFA World Cups and has won three CONCACAF Gold Cup tournaments.

Torrado spent the majority of his club career with Cruz Azul, whom he captained to CONCACAF Champions League success in 2014.

Club career
Born in Mexico City, Torrado began his career with UNAM in 1997. After a few years playing in Spain, he became a Cruz Azul player in 2005, débuting against Monarcas Morelia where he scored the two goals in the 2–0 win for Cruz Azul. He rapidly emerged as one of the most important players in the squad. An aggressive midfielder, Torrado has gotten many red and yellow cards in his career. He has captained the team since 2006, and has led the team to three league finals and a CONCACAF Champions League final in 2009, and on 26 April 2014 he became CONCACAF champion for the first time in his career with Cruz Azul.

Spain
After débuting for UNAM in 1997, Torrado was bought three years later by Spanish club CD Tenerife where he played almost the whole season. The following year he was transferred to Poli Ejido. He caught the eye of Spanish club Sevilla where he had success in his first season but an injury left him out for almost a full season. He was then transferred to Racing de Santander. He did not have much chance to play because of his reported differences with the coach. He was eventually forced to return to Mexico.

Indy Eleven
On 8 June 2016, Torrado signed for NASL side Indy Eleven, extending his contract for the 2017 season on 26 January 2017.

Torrado retired on 30 October 2017 ending a 20-year career span.

International career
Torrado made an impact when he represented Mexico at the 1999 FIFA U-20 World Cup, which put the spotlight on him as a potential national team player. Ever since his début in a friendly match against Argentina, he has become a mainstay in the national team. Torrado scored his first goal for Mexico in the 1999 Copa América against Peru, scoring with a stunning long-range shot in stoppage time which saved the game for Mexico. His goal ensured that the match ended 3–3 and Mexico then went on to win on penalties. Torrado has been in the Mexico squads for the 2002, 2006 and 2010 FIFA World Cup and was vice-captain for the 2010 tournament in South Africa, playing in all four of Mexico's matches as they were eliminated in the Round of 16 after losing 3–1 to Argentina.

After retirement
Following his retirement as a footballer, on 24 August 2017, Guillermo Cantú announced Torrado as sporting director for the Mexican Football Federation. On 13 July 2022, Torrado was dismissed from his position following a string of disappointing results.

In December 2022, Torrado joined the newly-established Kings League as the manager for Pio FC. On 1 January 2023, the team suffered a 5–0 loss to El Barrio during the league's inaugural match day.

Career statistics

International

Statistics accurate as of match played 6 September 2013

International goals
Scores and results list Mexico's goal tally first.

Honours
Cruz Azul
Copa MX: Clausura 2013
CONCACAF Champions League: 2013–14

Indy Eleven
Spring Champions: 2016

Mexico
FIFA Confederations Cup: 1999
CONCACAF Gold Cup: 2009, 2011

Individual
Mexican Primera División Defensive Midfielder of the Tournament: Apertura 2009
CONCACAF Gold Cup All-Tournament Team: 2009
FIFA Club World Cup Top Scorer (Shared): 2014

See also 
 List of men's footballers with 100 or more international caps

References

External links
Official website

 Football Database.com provides Gerardo Torrado's profile and stats

1979 births
Living people
Cruz Azul footballers
Liga MX players
La Liga players
North American Soccer League players
CD Tenerife players
Polideportivo Ejido footballers
Racing de Santander players
Sevilla FC players
Indy Eleven players
Club Universidad Nacional footballers
1999 FIFA Confederations Cup players
1999 Copa América players
2000 CONCACAF Gold Cup players
2001 Copa América players
2002 FIFA World Cup players
2004 Copa América players
2005 FIFA Confederations Cup players
2006 FIFA World Cup players
2007 CONCACAF Gold Cup players
2007 Copa América players
2009 CONCACAF Gold Cup players
2010 FIFA World Cup players
2011 CONCACAF Gold Cup players
2013 FIFA Confederations Cup players
CONCACAF Gold Cup-winning players
FIFA Confederations Cup-winning players
Universidad Iberoamericana alumni
Mexico under-20 international footballers
Mexico international footballers
Mexican expatriate footballers
Mexican footballers
Footballers from Mexico City
Mexican expatriate sportspeople in Spain
Expatriate footballers in Spain
Expatriate soccer players in the United States
FIFA Century Club
Mexico youth international footballers
Association football midfielders